Erskine Island is a small coral cay in the southern Great Barrier Reef, located 60 kilometres northeast of Gladstone, Queensland and 17 km west-south-west of Heron Island.  It is part of the  Capricornia Cays National Park and of the Capricornia Cays Important Bird Area.

Flora and fauna
The Capricorn silvereye, a small bird endemic to islands in the Capricorn-Bunker Group, is resident on Erskine. Loggerhead turtles nest on the beaches. It is the type locality of the shrimp Periclimenes madreporae Bruce, 1969.

See also

 List of islands of Australia

References

 

Islands on the Great Barrier Reef
Important Bird Areas of Queensland
Uninhabited islands of Australia
Central Queensland